The Stanford Dish, known locally as the Dish, is a radio antenna in the Stanford foothills.  The  dish was built in 1961 by the Stanford Research Institute (now SRI International).  The cost to construct the antenna was $4.5 million, and was funded by the United States Air Force.  In the 1960s the Dish was used to provide information on Soviet radar installations by detecting radio signals bounced off the moon.

Later on, the Dish was used to communicate with satellites and spacecraft. With its unique bistatic range radio communications, where the transmitter and receiver are separate units, the powerful radar antenna was well-suited for communicating with spacecraft in regions where conventional radio signals may be disrupted.

At one point, the Dish transmitted signals to each of the Voyager craft that NASA dispatched into the outer reaches of the solar system. In 1982 it was used to rescue the amateur radio satellite UoSAT-1.

Today
The dish is still actively used today for academic and research purposes. It is owned by the U.S. Government and operated by SRI International. It is used for commanding and calibrating spacecraft and for radio astronomy measurements.

Recreational route
The area around the Dish offers a popular 3.5 mile recreational trail, visited by an average of 1,500–1,800 people daily. The trail around the dish is known for its rolling hills and beautiful views, which on a clear day extend to San Jose, San Francisco, and the East Bay. The Stanford Running Club hosts an annual Dish Race and fun run that forms a 3.25 mile loop around the Dish trail.

While hikers, walkers, and runners are welcome, biking and dogs at the dish are not allowed on the trail. The opening hours are as per the schedule below, roughly matching daylight hours:

As of June 2018, 360 cows were grazing on the grounds of the Stanford Dish.  Stanford leases the land to farmers who own the cows.

References

External links 
 Stanford Dish Area - official web page
 SRI Dish page (archive link)

Radio telescopes
Stanford University places
Astronomical imaging
Astronomical instruments
Buildings and structures in Santa Clara County, California
SRI International
Trails in the San Francisco Bay Area
Buildings and structures completed in 1966